Nandalala is a 2010 Indian Tamil-language independent drama film written and directed by Mysskin. He himself plays the lead role, alongside newcomer Ashwath Ram and Snigdha Akolkar. The film, which is produced by Ayngaran International and features a highly acclaimed musical score by Ilaiyaraaja, is based on the 1999 Japanese film Kikujiro, and partly inspired from Mysskin's life. The movie was an average grosser.

The film illustrates the road journey of two people, a mentally challenged adult and an eight-year-old schoolboy, both in search of their respective mothers. Myshkin began developing Nandalala in 2006, penning the scriptment for eight months. Supposed to be filmed, after the release of Myshkin's debut film Chithiram Pesuthadi (2006), the film was shelved since no producer came forward to fund the film, and was launched only in June 2008, after the release of Myshkin's second film Anjathe (2008). It was completed by December 2008, but got stuck in development hell later, with no distributors willing to release the film. Following numerous preview shows and screenings at several film festivals, the film eventually released on 26 November 2010, opening to very positive reviews and garnering critical acclaim.

Cast 
 Mysskin as Bhaskar Mani
 Ashwath Ram as Akhilesh
 Snigdha Akolkar as Anjali
 Nassar as Lorry Driver
 Rohini as Mentally ill woman
 Kalaiyarasan as Drunkard
 Leena Maria Paul

Production

Development 
After Myshkin had completed and released his maiden venture Chithiram Pesuthadi in 2006, he wrote the script for Nandalala for eight months, which was supposed to be his next directorial. A. M. Ratnam was initially to produce the film, for which his son Ravi Krishna was to play the lead role. Despite completing a photo shoot with Ravi Krishna, the film was shelved, since Ratnam opted out, after he incurred heavy losses with his previous productions. Director Saran was subsequently approached by Myshkin to produce the film, but as he wasn't impressed by the storyline and suggested some changes, which Myshkin didn't agree to, he, too, dropped the film. Myshkin decided to postpone the project, since "nobody was interested", and instead wrote a new story and commenced a new project, which itself was a result of Myshkin's anger. Myshkin later revealed, that in spite of demands from the producers, he didn't make any compromises in this film, in contrast to his previous ventures, as Nandhalala was his "dream project".

That film was Anjathe, which released in 2008, following which Myshkin re-commenced Nandalala, taking up the lead role himself, after several lead actors from the Tamil film industry had rejected the offer, fearing of "their image would get damaged". The lead character, Bhaskar Mani, that Myshkin plays in the film was initially supposed to be around 20 years old; however, as no actor, including Vikram, was willing to take the role and he decide to play the character, he changed the age to 27 to make it more suitable. For the seven-year-old schoolboy character, newcomer Ashwath Ram was selected, after over 100 children were auditioned. Snigdha Akolkar, who had performed an item number in Anjathe, was chosen to enact the lead female character, while Rohini was signed to play the mother of the lead character Bhaskar Mani. Nandhalala was initially Snigdha's debut Tamil film, for which Myshkin had signed her in 2006 already, but with the film getting postponed, she made her first appearance in Anjathe that Myshkin decided to direct instead. Reports indicated that Arya's brother Zahir had been signed for a pivotal as well, which turned out to be untrue. The film's filming began in late June 2008 eventually, was completed in 81 days, with major portions being shot on highways and roads in Chennai, and Gobichettipalayam. After Ilaiyaraaja had completed the film score of the film, the soundtrack album was released in January 2009, while the first trailer was premiered in July 2009 alongside Sundar C.'s Ainthaam Padai.

Soundtrack 

After working with Sundar C. Babu for both his previous films, Myshkin opted to collaborate with composer Ilaiyaraaja for Nandalalas music. The soundtrack album to this film was released on 14 January 2009, during Pongal at the Four Frames theater in Chennai. The album features 6 tracks while, however, only two of them were included in the final version. Ilaiyaraaja had performed three songs himself, one of which "Oru vandu Kootame" along with his grandson and Karthik Raja's eldest son Yatheeshwaran. The sixth song in the album "Elilea Elilea" was written and sung by a gypsy woman called Saroja Ammal in her mother tongue. Apart from Saroja Ammal, five lyricists had penned the songs, namely Na. Muthukumar, Mu. Metha, Muthulingam, Kabilan and Pazhani Bharathi.

Myshkin stated that he had requested Ilaiyaraaja to come up with a music that should be "enjoyed and appreciated by the likes of a hunter in an African cave". Ilaiyaraaja, hence, composed a "simple" and "minimalized" score and had written a symphonic piece, using only three instruments, a flute, an oboe and a violin, for which three specialized Hungarian artists from the Budapest Festival Orchestra were invited.

Release 
Made on a budget of 3.5 crore, Nandalala'''s post-production works were finished in early 2009, Nandalala was evading release dates for over a year, mainly since distributors were fearing and unwilling to distribute the film due to its offbeat theme. Finally Ayngaran International was able to release the film on 26 November 2010, one-a-half years after its completion, facing opposition from newcomer Sripathy's Kanimozhi. Nandalala took the better opening at the Chennai box office, opening at second position, ranking just behind Mynaa, while earning  20,89,502 from 146 screens. The film was subsequently crowded out at the box-office by new releases, becoming an average grosser.

 Reviews 
Before the wide theatrical release on 26 November, the film was screened several times at film festivals and as preview shows to prominent filmmakers, actors and distributors. Following one such preview show, actor-director Kamal Haasan had described the film as an "excellent, must-watch film", recommending Sun Pictures to distribute the film. At the Norway Film Festival, the film had won the Critics' as well as the People's Choice Award.

After its theatrical release, the film gained mostly highly positive reviews and praise, with most critics claiming that Myshkin had made a meaningful film that marks a milestone in Tamil cinema. The Hindus Malathi Rangarajan, too gave a very positive verdict, calling it the "real road film" that is made "for seekers of worthy cinema". Further praising the director, she cites that Myshkin "rises high above the standards he set with the earlier quality cocktails" and that "Tamil cinema needs more creators like him". Pavithra Srinivasan of Rediff rated the film four out five describing Nandalala as "brilliant", eventually finding a place in the list of her "Best Tamil films of 2010" article, while a review from Indiaglitz labelled the film as "mindblowing and marvellous", further claiming that Myshkin "seems to have taken Tamil cinema to a new height".

A Behindwoods reviewer, too, gave the film four out of five, describing the film as "Picture Perfect" that "transcends genres and even barriers of language". Top10Cinemas reviewer labelled the film as Mysskin's "yet another trademark", while, as per Sify.com, a "popular English daily" had given it four and a half out five, the highest rating it has given for any Tamil film. Meanwhile, Sify critic Sreedhar Pillai in his review described Nandalala as "another heart wrenching story" that was "slow and melancholic", claiming it was for people "like films that explores the realms of anguish and despair".

 Plagiarism 
The film drew criticism for its inspiration from Kikujiro. Whilst The New Indian Express'' review tributed Ilaiyaraaja for an "outstanding" background score, it criticised Myshkin for replicating "not just the concept, but almost the entire graph of the plot and narration" of the original, labelling it as "blatant plagiarism". The critic added that it is "not just an embarrassment to the maker, but to the viewer too".

References

External links 
 

2010 films
2010s drama road movies
Films scored by Ilaiyaraaja
Films directed by Mysskin
2010s Tamil-language films
Indian drama road movies
Indian remakes of Japanese films
2010 drama films